Sikkilsdalen is a valley in Nord-Fron municipality in Innlandet county, Norway. The valley is surrounded by several notable mountains including Heimdalshøe, Sikkilsdalshøa, Gravdalsknappen, and Ingulssjøhøi.

The Sikkilsdalen valley is used as grazing land for horses in the summer. The Royal Mountain Chalet, Prinsehytta, belonging to the Norwegian Royal Family is located in Sikkilsdalen.

References

Jotunheimen
Nord-Fron
Valleys of Innlandet